The 2012–13 season was the 113th season in Società Sportiva Lazio's history and their 25th consecutive season in the top-flight of Italian football.

Pre-season
During the pre-season, Lazio bought Ederson from Lyon, Antonio Candreva from Udinese and Michaël Ciani from Bordeaux.

Friendlies

Players

Transfers

In

Out

Competitions

Serie A

League table

Results summary

Results by round

Matches

Coppa Italia

UEFA Europa League

Play-off round

Note 1: Mura 05 played their home match at Ljudski vrt, Maribor as their own Fazanerija City Stadium did not meet UEFA criteria.

Group stage

Knockout phase

Round of 32

Round of 16

Note 2: The first match that was played behind closed doors due to the punishment handed to Lazio by UEFA following racism issue of their 300 fans at Stadio Olimpico in a match against Borussia Mönchengladbach in second leg of 2012–13 UEFA Europa League round of 32.

Quarter-finals

Note 3: The second match that was played behind closed doors due to the punishment handed to Lazio by UEFA following racism issue of their 300 fans at Stadio Olimpico in a match against Borussia Mönchengladbach in second leg of 2012–13 UEFA Europa League round of 32.

Statistics

Appearances and goals

|-
! colspan="15" style="background:#dcdcdc; text-align:center"| Goalkeepers

|-
! colspan="15" style="background:#dcdcdc; text-align:center"| Defenders

|-
! colspan="15" style="background:#dcdcdc; text-align:center"| Midfielders

|-
! colspan="15" style="background:#dcdcdc; text-align:center"| Forwards

|-
! colspan="15" style="background:#dcdcdc; text-align:center"| Players transferred out during the season

Goalscorers

References

S.S. Lazio seasons
Lazio
Lazio